Daniel Jurč (born 7 March 1983 in Humenné) is a Slovak football defender who currently plays for FK Inter Bratislava.

References

External links
Futbalnet profile

1983 births
Living people
Slovak footballers
Association football defenders
MFK Ružomberok players
MFK Dolný Kubín players
FK Inter Bratislava players
Slovak Super Liga players
Sportspeople from Humenné